Serge Panizza (19 November 1942 – 24 March 2016) was a French sabre fencer. He competed at the 1968 and 1972 Summer Olympics.

References

External links
 

1942 births
2016 deaths
French male sabre fencers
Olympic fencers of France
Fencers at the 1968 Summer Olympics
Fencers at the 1972 Summer Olympics
Fencers from Paris